Jair Nunes do Espírito Santo (born 15 September 1994), also known simply as Jair, is a Santomean international footballer who plays for CD Cruz as a midfielder.

Career
He made his international debut for São Tomé and Príncipe in 2011 against Congo at the first leg of 2014 FIFA World Cup qualification (CAF). He scored his first international goal against Lesotho at 2013 Africa Cup of Nations qualification, netting a penalty kick. He scored his second international goal - also from the penalty spot - against Sierra Leone at the same qualifying.

International goals

References

External links

1994 births
Living people
People from São Tomé
São Tomé and Príncipe footballers
Association football midfielders
São Tomé and Príncipe international footballers
Grupo Desportivo Cruz Vermelha players
Sporting Praia Cruz players
São Tomé and Príncipe expatriate footballers
São Tomé and Príncipe expatriate sportspeople in Portugal
Expatriate footballers in Portugal